Fontanile is a comune (municipality) in the Province of Asti in the Italian region Piedmont, located about  southeast of Turin and about  southeast of Asti.

Fontanile borders the following municipalities: Alice Bel Colle, Castel Boglione, Castel Rocchero, Castelletto Molina, Mombaruzzo, Nizza Monferrato, and Quaranti.

Demographic evolution

References

External links

 www.comune.fontanile.at.it

Cities and towns in Piedmont